Newmans Tours Ltd v Ranier Investments Ltd [1992] 2 NZLR 68; aff'd sub nom is a cited case in New Zealand regarding relief under the Contractual Remedies Act 1979 where a contract is repudiated by one of the parties.

References

Court of Appeal of New Zealand cases
New Zealand contract case law
1992 in New Zealand law
1992 in case law